Jeffrey W. "Jeff" Hall (born December 26, 1951) is an American politician and accountant serving as the 24th mayor of Alexandria, Louisiana. On taking office on December 4, 2018, he stepped down as a Democratic member of the Louisiana House of Representatives for District 26 in Rapides Parish, a position which he assumed in 2015.

Early life and education 
Hall graduated from Grambling State University in Grambling, Louisiana. He has  resided in Pineville, Opelousas, and Mansfield, Louisiana, and Amarillo, Texas.

Career 
Hall stressed economic development, jobs, and resolving the $1 billion state budget shortfall as the principal issues he would face as state representative.

In 2018, Hall announced that he would again run for mayor of Alexandria. Mayor Jacques Roy, first elected in 2006, chose not seek a fourth term in the November 6 primary.

Hall placed first in the Democratic primary and won the general election with 7,842 votes. Turnout was just under 50 percent of registered voters.

On November 8, 2022, Hall was defeated by his predecessor, Jacques Roy, in the Alexandria mayoral race, receiving 22% of the vote to Roy's 55%.

References

1951 births
Living people
Mayors of Alexandria, Louisiana
Democratic Party members of the Louisiana House of Representatives
Politicians from Alexandria, Louisiana
Place of birth missing (living people)
People from Pineville, Louisiana
People from Opelousas, Louisiana
People from Mansfield, Louisiana
Politicians from Amarillo, Texas
Activists for African-American civil rights
African-American state legislators in Louisiana
Grambling State University alumni
Businesspeople from Louisiana
Activists from Texas
21st-century American politicians
21st-century African-American politicians
20th-century African-American people